The European Infrastructure Consolidation is a base closure process of the United States Department of Defense which focuses on restructuring forces in Europe. While similar to the Base Realignment and Closure process in the mainland United States, the process is generally easier due to members of Congress not fighting to save bases in their home districts and states.

See also
Base Realignment and Closure

References

External links
2015 European Infrastructure Consolidation Map

Lists of United States military installations
Military history of the United States
United States Department of Defense
United States defense policymaking